Dmytro Bohachov (born 25 August 1992) is a Ukrainian football midfielder who plays for PFC Sumy.

Career
Bohachov is a product of the Youth Sportive School Zmina in his native city Sumy.

He is playing in his career only in one club – FC Sumy and was promoted together with his teammates from the Ukrainian Second League to the Ukrainian First League.

References

External links 
 
 

1992 births
Sportspeople from Sumy
Living people
Ukrainian footballers
PFC Sumy players
Association football midfielders